A movement director creates physical vocabularies through actor movement in a variety of production settings that include theatre, television, film, opera, fashion and animation.

Background

Movement directors work closely with directors and performers, collaborating with the creative team to realise the physical life of work. They propose a physical language to performers and directors, and devise training methods or teach skills that will help facilitate a specific physical style. The movement director may create, and research information about etiquette, (including proxemics, gestural language, social codes, etc.), a character's condition (related to medical conditions within their historical context, and factors such as inebriation, pregnancy, etc.) and personal journey (ageing, etc.), as well as specialist movement (e.g. period dances, dexterity in falling, lifts and acrobatics, animal work, cross-gendered performance) or chorus work. Movement direction has its origins in theatre practice and is now being widely used in other allied performance arts such as opera, film, television, commercials, mass movement events, puppetry, movement coaching, and photography.

Although choreography maybe part of a movement director's skill-set, this does not mean that every choreographer is also a movement director. Specialist movement consultants may focus on other specific areas (e.g. as in the work on primate movement by Peter Elliot in Greystoke: The Legend of Tarzan, Lord of the Apes). In recent years, fashion commerce has looked to develop campaigns, shoots and catwalk shows further with the help of professional movement directors and consultants, such as, Stephen Galloway, Jordan Robson, Ryan Heffington, Ryan-Walker Page and Eric Christison.

History

In Britain

The role described by the title of movement director today has been in existence since at least the start of the 20th century, although rarely mentioned in programmes or credits. Movement directors often work at a crossover point, shifting between teaching and directing movement for actors, and have also been termed as a movement coach, theatre choreographer, or movement support.

The National Theatre created the role Head of Movement that was held by Jane Gibson for a period of ten years. Glynn MacDonald has been the long-standing Master of Movement at the Globe Theatre, collaborating with visiting movement directors and choreographers. 2009 saw the appointment of Struan Leslie as Head of Movement at the Royal Shakespeare Company. This was the only official Head of Movement position within a British theatre company at the time.

Many contemporary movement directors have established long running relationships with certain companies, with whom they have created a shared body of work and working methodology. These are for example Jane Gibson with Cheek by Jowl, Kate Flatt and Struan Leslie with Katie Mitchell at the National Theatre and English National Opera, and Liz Ranken with Shared Experience. Other contemporary movement directors include Michael Ashcroft, Peter Darling, Lucy Cullingford, Vanessa Ewan, Leah Hausmann, Steven Hoggett and Scott Graham (Frantic Assembly), Georgina Lamb, Sue Lefton, Toby Sedgwick, Polly Bennett, Ayse Tashkiran, Sian Williams, Anne Yee, Rachael Nanyonjo, Imogen Knight, Paul Harris, Diane Alison-Mitchell, Anna Morrissey, Aline David, Paul Sadot, Shelley Maxwell.

Movement directors today emerge from a rich heritage of movement pedagogues and practitioners. French director and practitioner Jacques Lecoq, and movement theorist and pedagogue Rudolf Laban offer important influences. Many of their students and contemporaries became influential teachers of movement and movement directors in British theatre, often influenced by and interweaving with the lineage of contemporary dance as influenced by Laban, and the heritage of social and cultural dances. Claude Chagrin, who trained with Jacques Lecoq, was the movement person with the National Theatre Company before and while it became permanently resident in Denys Lasdun's National Theatre Building in 1976. She was also the first person to be credited for movement, on the production of The Royal Hunt of the Sun (dir. Peter Shaffer, 1964). Michel Saint-Denis taught movement in London and was an influential associate director alongside Peter Brook at the Royal Shakespeare Company from 1962 until 1966, introducing influences from his work in Paris with his uncle Jacques Copeau. Other notable teachers who have shaped British movement work today are Trish Arnold, Geraldine Stephenson, Jean Newlove, Litz Pisk, Monika Pagneux,Yat Malmgren and Belinda Quirey.

In 2020 Movement Directors in Contemporary Theatre: Conversations on Craft by Ayse Tashkiran (Bloomsbury, Methuen Drama, Great Britain) was published.  This is the first book of its kind to illuminate the practices of contemporary movement directors. In 2022 Movement Direction: Developing Physical Narratives for Performance by Kate Flatt OBE, The Crowood Press, Wiltshire, UK (2022) was published.

In 2020 the Movement Director’s Association was established, an industry facing professional guild for working movement directors in the UK.

Contemporary developments

Movement directors have sought to be named, in recognition of the existence of their profession, for many decades, and are increasingly gathering recognition. Relevant training for practitioners is now offered through recognized higher education degrees focusing on movements in theatre, such as the Master of Arts (MA) in movement studies at the Royal Central School of Speech and Drama, founded by Vanessa Ewan and Debbie Green in 2004, and now jointly led by Ayse Tashkiran and Vanessa Ewan, re-titled MA/MFA Movement: Directing and Teaching, and the MA in Training Actors Movement, led by Wendy Allnutt at the Guildhall School of Music and Drama. Manchester Metropolitan University also offers an MA in movement practice for theatre.

Movement director course leader at the Central School of Speech and Drama, Ayse Tashkiran, is researching a comprehensive history of movement direction and creating a platform where movement practitioners are able to share their work and facilitate an understanding of their profession by a wider audience. Industry initiatives to draw out the work of movement directors include the Young Vic and the Royal Shakespeare Company with a variety of workshops, apprenticeships and placements.

References 

 
 http://www.cssd.ac.uk/postgrad.php/14/movement_studies.html

Further reading
 Callery, D. (2001). Through the Body, London, Nick Hern Books.
 Chambers, C. (2004). Inside the Royal Shakespeare Company, London & New York, Routledge.
 Conway, M. (2008). Tea with Trish: the movement work of Trish Arnold, Parts 1 and 2 New York.
 Dennis, A. (2002). The articulate body: the physical training of the actor, London: Nick Hern.
 Flatt K. and Melrose, S. "Finding – and owning – a Voice: Choreographic Signature and Intellectual Property in Collaborative Practices", Dance Theatre Journal Vol. 22 – 2
 Flatt K. (2022).Movement Direction: Developing Physical Narratives for Performance, The Crowood Press, Wiltshire, UK. 
 Evans, M. (2009). Movement training for the modern actor London, Routledge
 Ewan, V. and Green, D. ( 2014). " Actor Movement: Expression of the Physical Being" London, Bloomsbury
 Hodgson, John & Preston-Dunlop, Valerie (1990): Rudolf Laban: An Introduction to his Work and Influence, Plymouth Northcote House.
 Hope-Wallace, P. (1966). The Guardian, Review of ‘The Royal Hunt of the Sun’, National Theatre, 1966
 Mitchell, K. (2009). The director's craft : a handbook for the theatre, London, Routledge.
 National Theatre Archive, accessed 27.01.2009.
 Pisk, L. (1975). The actor and his body, London: Harrap
 Tashkiran, A (2016). Chapter 25 in ‘British Movement Directors’ in The Routledge Companion to Jacques Lecoq, edited by Rick Kemp and Mark Evans (Abingdon; Routledge).
 Tashkiran, A. (2020). Movement Directors in Contemporary Theatre: Conversations on Craft, (Bloomsbury, Methuen Drama, Great Britain).
 Tashkiran, A. (2009). "Movement Directors: the secret weapons of theatre, Research Presentation by Ayse Tashkiran at Central School of Speech and Drama", CSSD Library.

External links
 https://web.archive.org/web/20150126062616/http://www.nationaltheatre.org.uk/video/what-is-a-movement-director
 https://web.archive.org/web/20150109032728/http://www.nationaltheatre.org.uk/video/history-of-movement-direction

Theatrical occupations